Julia Görges was the defending champion, but she lost to Samantha Stosur in the second round.

Maria Sharapova won the title, defeating Victoria Azarenka in the final, 6–1, 6–4. Sharapova won the title after saving a match point in her quarterfinal match against Samantha Stosur. This tournament was the first since Wimbledon in 2009 in which the top four players in the world reached the semifinals.

Seeds
The top four seeds received a bye into the second round.

Draw

Finals

Top half

Bottom half

Qualifying

Seeds

Qualifiers

Lucky losers
  Kateryna Bondarenko
  Akgul Amanmuradova

Draw

First qualifier

Second qualifier

Third qualifier

Fourth qualifier

External links
 Main draw
 Qualifying draw

Porsche Tennis Grand Prix Singles
2012 Women's Singles